In the 1852 Chicago mayoral election, incumbent Democrat Walter S. Gurnee defeated former mayor James Curtiss (running as an independent) as well as Temperance candidate Amos G. Throop and Mechanics candidate Peter Page by a ten-point margin.

Campaign
B.W. Raymond was the initial nominee of the Temperance (Prohibition) Party. However, for unspecified reasons, his candidacy was withdrawn in late February in favor of Throop.

The election was an energetic one, particularly due to the debate over liquor.

Other issues that were debated in the election were the reduction of taxes, avoiding an increase in city debt, preventing lawyers from obtaining gratuities, eliminating connection between the city government and private corporations, and suffrage.

It was alleged during the campaign that a candidate in the previous election had spent $3,000 in buying voters liquor.

Results

References

1852
Chicago
1852 Illinois elections
1850s in Chicago